Floorball was contested at the 1997 World Games as an invitational sport. It will return to the World Games as an official sport in the 2017 edition. Only men's teams were allowed to compete in 1997 and the same will happen in 2017.

Medalists

Men

Men's tournament

See also
Floorball World Championships

References

World Games
Floorball